Oliver Daedlow (born 29 June 2000) is a German footballer who plays as a central midfielder or attacking midfielder for Hansa Rostock II.

Career
Daedlow was born in Neubrandenburg. He played youth football for 1. FC Neubrandenburg 04 before joining Hansa Rostock's academy in 2016.

He made his Hansa Rostock debut on 1 July 2020 in a 1–0 3. Liga victory over KFC Uerdingen 05. Later that month, he signed his first professional contract with the club, lasting until 2022.

He was loaned out to TSV Havelse for the 2021–22 season.

References

2000 births
Living people
German footballers
People from Neubrandenburg
Footballers from Mecklenburg-Western Pomerania
Association football midfielders
1. FC Neubrandenburg 04 players
FC Hansa Rostock players
TSV Havelse players
3. Liga players
Oberliga (football) players